The Big 12 Conference is a conference of 14 universities which participate in the National Collegiate Athletic Association's Division I Football Bowl Subdivision football.  The conference formed in 1994 and begin conference play in the fall of 1996.  The schools that compose the Big 12 Conference, except for Brigham Young, Central Florida, Cincinnati, and West Virginia, were members of either the Big Eight Conference or the Southwest Conference, and have won 21 national titles including 3 titles since the inception of the Big 12 Conference.

Membership

Current

†Divisions existed from 1996 through 2010.
‡: The Big 12 Conference recognizes TCU and Baylor as co-champions in 2014

Former

Facilities and coaches

Realignment
In 2010 it was announced that in 2011 both Nebraska and Colorado would leave the Big 12 for the Big Ten and Pac-10 respectively. Then in 2011 it was announced that Texas A&M and Missouri would both be leaving for the SEC. As replacements, TCU and West Virginia would be joining the conference from the Mountain West and Big East respectively. In 2021, Oklahoma and Texas announced they would leave to join the Southeastern Conference. In response, the Big 12 decided to backfill with the University of Cincinnati, the University of Central Florida, the University of Houston, and Brigham Young University. The first 3 schools joining from the American Athletic Conference and BYU has been an Independent in football since 2010 with its basketball team playing in the West Coast Conference.

Scheduling

Divisions

From the time the league was formed until realignment, the conference was split into two, six team, divisions.  Teams played a total of 11 regular season games, three non-conference match-ups and eight conference games per season. The conference games were a combination of five divisional foes and three from the opposing division. Inter-divisional play is a "three-on, three-off" system, where teams will play three teams from the other division on a home-and-home basis for two seasons, and then play the other three foes from the opposite side for a two-year home-and-home.

At the conclusion of the regular season, the top team from the South Division played the top team from the North Division in the Big 12 Championship Game.

Round-robin
After the departure of Nebraska and Colorado, both the divisional format and the Championship Game were dropped. Members continue to play three non-conference opponents in addition to playing all nine other members of the conference on an annual basis.

Starting again in 2017 the Championship Game was reinstated, the two teams with the highest conference winning percentage play in the game.

Champions

Since its inception in 1996, the Big 12 championship has been won by nine different schools, three of which no longer belong to the conference. From 1996 to 2010, the championship was determined in the Big 12 championship game. Following the departures of two schools in 2010, the conference discontinued the championship game in favor of a round-robin format to determine the champion. The University of Oklahoma Sooners have won the most championships with 14.

Championship game

The Big 12 Championship Game was first held by the Big 12 Conference each year from 1996 until 2010 and again starting with the 2017 season. The original championship game pitted the Big 12 North Division champion against the Big 12 South Division champion in a game held after the regular season has been completed. The first championship game was held during the 1996 season in St. Louis. The 2009 and 2010 games were played at Cowboys Stadium in Arlington, Texas. Following the departures of Nebraska and Colorado to the Big Ten and Pac-12 respectively, the Big 12 Championship Game was discontinued. Following an NCAA rule change in 2015 which allows conferences with fewer than 12 members to hold a championship game, the Big 12 elected to return to a postseason championship game to determine the conference champion. Following the completion of the round-robin regular season, the conference's top two teams compete in the championship game. Oklahoma defeated TCU 41–17 on December 2, 2017, in the first Big 12 Championship Game played since 2010.

Championships by school

†: Denotes co-champion
‡: Denotes former member of the conference

Bowl games

†:The Big 12 champion will go to the Sugar Bowl unless selected for the CFP. In the event that the conference champion is selected for the playoff, the conference runner up will go to the Sugar Bowl.
‡:Conference representative will play in the bowls on a rotating basis.

Final standings

Records

Overall series records

Rivalries
Conference rivalries (primarily in football) mostly predate the conference. The Kansas-Missouri rivalry was the longest running, the longest west of the Mississippi and the second-longest in college football. It was played 119 times before Missouri left the Big 12. As of October 2012, the University of Kansas' athletic department had not accepted Missouri's invitations to play inter-conference rivalry games, putting the rivalry on hold. Sports clubs sponsored by the two universities continued to play each other.

Current 

Totals through the end of the 2021 season.

Former

Future 

Totals through the end of the 2022 season.

See also
List of American collegiate athletic stadiums and arenas

References

External links
 

 
1996 establishments in the United States